Borrowed Plumage is a 1917 American silent comedy adventure film directed by Raymond B. West and starring Bessie Barriscale. It was produced by the Triangle Film Corporation.

A print exists in the Library of Congress collection. It is incomplete missing a reel.

Cast
 Bessie Barriscale as Nora
 Arthur Maude as Darby O'Donovan
 Dorcas Matthews as Lady Angelica
 J. Barney Sherry (credited as Barney Sherry) as Earl of Selkirk
 Wallace Worsley as Sir Charles Broome
 Tod Burns as Giles

References

External links
 
 

1917 films
American silent feature films
Triangle Film Corporation films
American black-and-white films
American adventure comedy films
1910s adventure comedy films
1917 comedy films
Films directed by Raymond B. West
1910s American films
Silent American comedy films
Silent adventure comedy films